Back Against the Wall is an album released in 2005 by Billy Sherwood in collaboration with a number of (mostly) progressive rock artists as a tribute to Pink Floyd's album The Wall. A year later, Sherwood followed it with the release of Return to the Dark Side of the Moon, a tribute to Pink Floyd's The Dark Side of the Moon.

Re-released in 2007 with additional bonus tracks as A Tribute To Pink Floyd: Re-Building The Wall.

Track listing 
All tracks by Roger Waters except noted. All credits adapted from Discogs.

Disc one 
 "In the Flesh?" (3:19)
 Adrian Belew (Frank Zappa, King Crimson, Talking Heads) - Lead Vocal
 Alan White (Yes) - Drums
 Keith Emerson (The Nice, Emerson, Lake & Palmer) - Organ
 Gary Green (Gentle Giant) - Guitars
 John Giblin (Peter Gabriel, Simple Minds, David Sylvian, Kate Bush) - Bass
 Billy Sherwood (Yes) - Keyboards, Vocals
 Michael Sherwood - Vocals
 "The Thin Ice" (2:29)
 Ian Anderson (Jethro Tull) - Vocals, Flute
 Tony Levin (King Crimson, Peter Gabriel, Liquid Tension Experiment) - Bass
 Gary Green - Guitars
 Jay Schellen (Asia) - Drums
 Billy Sherwood - Keyboards, Backing Vocals
 "Another Brick in the Wall Part I" (3:14)
 Steve Morse (Deep Purple, Dixie Dregs) - Lead Guitar
 Billy Sherwood - Vocals, Keyboards, Electric Guitars, Bass
 "The Happiest Days of Our Lives" (1:43)
 Billy Sherwood - Vocals, Keyboards, Guitars, Bass
 Vinnie Colaiuta (Frank Zappa, Sting, Herbie Hancock, Jeff Beck) - Drums
 "Another Brick in the Wall Part II" (4:02)
 Fee Waybill (The Tubes) - Lead Vocals
 Ronnie Montrose - Lead Guitar
 Mike Porcaro (Toto) - Bass
 Alex Ligertwood (Average White Band, Santana) and David Glen Eisley  (Giuffria) - Backing Vocals
 Greg Bissonette (Steve Vai, David Lee Roth, Joe Satriani) - Drums
 Billy Sherwood - Keyboards
 The Milikan Musical Theatre Children's Choir conducted by Leo Krubsack
 "Mother" (5:58)
 John Wetton (Family, King Crimson, Roxy Music, Uriah Heep, U.K., Wishbone Ash, Asia) - Vocals, Bass
 Adrian Belew - Lead Guitar
 Alan White - Drums
 Billy Sherwood - Acoustic and Electric Guitars
 "Goodbye Blue Sky" (2:44)
 Steve Howe (Yes, Asia) - Acoustic Guitars
 Billy Sherwood - Vocals, Keyboards
 Del Palmer (Kate Bush) - Bass
 "Empty Spaces" (2:08)
 Billy Sherwood - Vocals, Keyboards
 Robby Krieger (The Doors) - Guitars
 "Young Lust" (4:18) 
 Glenn Hughes (Deep Purple, Trapeze, Hughes/Thrall, Black Sabbath) - Vocals
 Elliot Easton (The Cars) - Lead Guitar
 Tony Franklin (The Firm, David Gilmour, Kate Bush, Whitesnake, Blue Murder, Roy Harper) - Bass
 Aynsley Dunbar (Frank Zappa, Lou Reed, Jefferson Starship, Jeff Beck, David Bowie, Whitesnake, Sammy Hagar, UFO, Journey) - Drums
 Bob Kulick (Lou Reed) - Electric Guitar
 Billy Sherwood - Keyboards
 "One of My Turns" (3:35)
 Tommy Shaw (Styx) - Lead Vocal, Guitars
 Larry Fast (Peter Gabriel) - Keyboards
 Jay Schellen - Drums
 John Giblin - Bass
 "Don't Leave Me Now" (4:08)
 Tommy Shaw - Lead Vocal
 Robby Krieger - Guitars
 Jay Schellen - Drums
 Billy Sherwood - Bass
 Geoff Downes (Yes, Asia) - Keyboards
 "Another Brick in the Wall Part III" (1:39)
 Steve Lukather (Toto) - Lead Vocal
 Tony Levin - Bass
 Jay Schellen - Drums
 Steve Porcaro (Toto) - Keyboards
 "Goodbye Cruel World" (1:00)
 Billy Sherwood - Vocals, Keyboards
 Tony Levin - Bass

Disc two 
 "Hey You" (4:43)
 John Wetton - Lead Vocal, Bass
 Steve Lukather - Lead Guitar
 Tommy Shaw - Acoustic Guitar
 Alan White - Drums
 Gary Green - Electric Guitars
 Geoff Downes - Keyboards
 Billy Sherwood - Vocals
 "Is There Anybody Out There?" (2:39)
 Adrian Belew - Acoustic Guitars
 Billy Sherwood - Lead Vocal, Keyboards, Bass
 Ian Anderson - Flute
 Michael Sherwood - Backing Vocals
 "Nobody Home" (3:11)
 Rick Wakeman (The Strawbs, Yes) - Piano
 Billy Sherwood - Lead Vocal, Orchestral Keyboards
 "Vera" (1:22)
 Tommy Shaw - Lead Vocal
 Steve Howe - Acoustic Guitars
 Billy Sherwood - Keyboards, Bass
 "Bring the Boys Back Home" (1:04)
 Billy Sherwood - Lead Vocal, Orchestral Keyboards
 Jay Schellen - Snare Drum, Percussion, Backing Vocals
 Michael Sherwood - Backing Vocals
 "Comfortably Numb" (6:51) 
 Chris Squire (Yes) - Lead Vocal, Bass
 Alan White - Drums
 Billy Sherwood - Lead Vocal, Guitars, Keyboards
 Jordan Berliant - Additional Acoustic Guitars
 "The Show Must Go On" (1:39)
 Adrian Belew - Lead Vocal
 Vinnie Colaiuta - Drums
 Billy Sherwood - Vocals, Keyboards, Guitars, Bass
 Michael Sherwood - Backing Vocals
 "In the Flesh" (4:19)
 Billy Sherwood - Lead Vocal
 Keith Emerson - Keyboards
 Vinnie Colaiuta - Drums
 Gary Green - Guitars
 John Giblin - Bass
 Michael Sherwood - Backing Vocals
 "Run Like Hell (5:09)" 
 Jason Scheff  (Chicago) - Vocals, Bass
 Dweezil Zappa (Zappa Plays Zappa) - Lead Guitar
 Tony Kaye (Yes) - Keyboard Solo
 Aynsley Dunbar - Drums
 Bob Kulick - Electric Guitars
 Billy Sherwood - Keyboards
 "Waiting for the Worms" (3:59)
 Billy Sherwood - Lead Vocal, Guitars, Keyboards
 Tony Levin - Bass, Stick
 Vinnie Colaiuta - Drums
 Keith Emerson - Organ Solo
 Jim Ladd - Ranting and Raving
 Michael Sherwood - Backing Vocals
 "Stop" (0:33)
 Billy Sherwood - Lead Vocals, Piano
 "The Trial" (5:19) 
 Malcolm McDowell - Lead Vocal
 Billy Sherwood - Orchestral Keyboards, Vocals
 "Outside the Wall" (1:46) 
 Billy Sherwood - Vocals, Keyboards
 Jim Ladd - Narration
 Michael Sherwood and Jay Schellen - Vocals

References

Tributes to The Wall
2005 albums